Bickerstaff is a surname. Notable people with the surname include:

 Bernie Bickerstaff (born 1944), assistant head coach of the NBA Cleveland Cavaliers, father of J. B. Bickerstaff
 J. B. Bickerstaff (born 1979), interim head coach of the NBA Houston Rockets, son of Bernie Bickerstaff
 Edwin Bickerstaff (1920–2008), neurologist after whom Bickerstaff's encephalitis and Bickerstaff's migraine are named
 Erik Bickerstaff (born 1980), Running Back in the National Football League who is currently a Free Agent
 Isaac Bickerstaff, a pseudonym used by Jonathan Swift as part of a hoax to predict the death of astrologer John Partridge
 Matt Bickerstaff (born 1976), Australian rugby league player
 Steve Bickerstaff (1946–2019), adjunct professor of law at the University of Texas Law School in Austin, Texas
 Tim Bickerstaff (1942–2009), New Zealand radio talkback host and pioneer
 William Bickerstaff (1728–1789), English antiquarian, curate, and schoolmaster

See also
 Isaac Bickerstaffe (1733–after 1808), Anglo-Irish playwright
 Bickerstaffe, village and civil parish in the West Lancashire district of Lancashire, England